Danilo Agustin "J.R." Pinnock (born December 11, 1983) is an American-Panamanian professional basketball player. His parents are natives of Panama.

Born in Fort Hood, Texas, Pinnock attended Coastal Christian Academy in Virginia Beach, Virginia, and Eagle's Landing High School in McDonough, Georgia.

Pinnock went on to attend George Washington University, where he was the team's leading scorer in the 2005–06 season, and helped lead them to two consecutive NCAA tournaments. He is a native of McDonough, Georgia. After college, he played in Greece's top professional basketball league the Greek league with Colossus Rhodes BC.

Pinnock was an early entry candidate who was selected by the Dallas Mavericks in the second round of the 2006 NBA Draft, 58th overall and then was later traded to the Los Angeles Lakers for whom he would appear in seven pre-season games. Pinnock was cut from the Lakers along with other Laker hopeful Von Wafer. He played some games in Germany for the Giessen 46ers, but was released by the club and returned to the United States, playing in the D-League, the NBA's minor league, for the Arkansas RimRockers. In September 2007, he was taken first overall in the D-League Expansion Draft by the Rio Grande Valley Vipers.

Pinnock played in BSN (Baloncesto Superior Nacional), Puerto Rico's professional basketball league, where he won his first professional championship with the Capitanes de Arecibo in 2010.  Danilo Pinnock won the championship again  in 2011 when Capitanes de Arecibo repeated as champions. Pinnock was released from Arecibo in March 2014.

Career statistics

Domestic leagues

External links
 
 J.R. Pinnock Draft Profile
 Giessen profile

1983 births
Living people
African-American basketball players
Arkansas RimRockers players
Atléticos de San Germán players
Basketball players at the 2007 Pan American Games
Basketball players from Georgia (U.S. state)
Basketball players from Texas
Dallas Mavericks draft picks
Elitzur Maccabi Netanya B.C. players
George Washington Colonials men's basketball players
Greek Basket League players
Israeli Basketball Premier League players
Kolossos Rodou B.C. players
Panamanian men's basketball players
Pan American Games competitors for Panama
People from Fort Hood, Texas
People from McDonough, Georgia
People with acquired Panamanian citizenship
Piratas de Quebradillas players
Rio Grande Valley Vipers players
Shooting guards
American sportspeople of Panamanian descent
American men's basketball players
Huracanes del Atlántico players